Father & Friend is a single by the Dutch artist Alain Clark. It was released as the second single in the Netherlands and the first and only single in the most European countries of his second album Live It Out. It is a duet with his father Dane Clark.

Charts

Weekly charts

Year-end charts

References

2008 singles
Dutch pop songs
English-language Dutch songs
Songs written by Alain Clark
2008 songs